Darb-e Behesht is a city and capital of Sarduiyeh District, in Jiroft County, Kerman Province, Iran.  At the 2006 census, its population was 3,456, in 562 families.

References

Populated places in Jiroft County

Cities in Kerman Province